The Chief of General Staff of Georgian Defense Forces is a high-ranking officer in the military of Georgia, who heads the General Staff of the Defense Forces of Georgia and is an ex officio Deputy Chief of the Defense Forces. The Chief is appointed by the Minister of Defense and reports to the Minister and Chief of Defense Forces.

Overview 
The Chief of General Staff exercises overall leadership of the General Staff and directs its day-to-day activities. The Chief is responsible for the proper execution of the tasks saddled on the General Staff, supervises planning of military operations, oversees coordination among the staffs of various units of the Defense Forces, and performs other functions as defined by the military law.

The Chief of General Staff is also a Deputy Chief of Defense Forces. They are appointed, with no term length, and released of the position by the Minister of Defense of Georgia.

History 
The office of the Chief of General Staff was introduced in Georgia following its independence from the Soviet Union in 1991. It has undergone several name changes since then. Prior to the 2018 reforms, the Chief was appointed by the President of Georgia on the advice of the Minister of Defense for a three-year term, with the possibility of extension for one year. The Chief was the highest-ranking military officer in the Georgian military, chief military adviser to the President, and wartime commander of the Armed Forces of Georgia.

List

Chief of General Staff of Georgian Armed Forces (1991–2008)
For period from 1921 to 1991, see Chief of the General Staff of the Soviet Union.

Chief of Joint Staff of Georgian Armed Forces (2008–2013)

Chief of General Staff of Georgian Armed Forces (2013–2018)

Chief of General Staff of Georgian Defence Forces (2018–present)

References

Military of Georgia (country)
Georgia